Armella Nicolas or La bonne Armelle (19 December 1606 – 24 October 1671) was a Breton serving-maid important in French popular Catholic piety.

References

1606 births
1671 deaths
17th-century Breton people